The Shaftesbury Memorial Fountain, popularly known as Eros, is a fountain surmounted by a winged statue of Anteros, located at the southeastern side of Piccadilly Circus in London, England. Moved after the Second World War from its original position in the centre of the circus, it was erected in 1892–93 to commemorate the philanthropic works of The 7th Earl of Shaftesbury, the Victorian politician and philanthropist, and his achievement in replacing child labour with school education. The fountain overlooks the south-west end of Shaftesbury Avenue, also named after the Earl.

Description and history
Alfred Gilbert's use of a nude figure on a public monument was controversial at the time of its construction, but it was generally well received by the public. The Magazine of Art described it as "a striking contrast to the dull ugliness of the generality of our street sculpture, ... a work which, while beautifying one of our hitherto desolate open spaces, should do much towards the elevation of public taste in the direction of decorative sculpture, and serve freedom for the metropolis from any further additions of the old order of monumental monstrosities." The statue has been called "London's most famous work of sculpture"; a graphical illustration of it is used as the symbol of the Evening Standard newspaper and appears on its masthead. It was the first sculpture in the world to be cast in aluminium and is set on a bronze fountain, which itself inspired the marine motifs that Gilbert carved on the statue.

Although the statue is generally known as Eros, it was created as an image of that Greek god's brother, Anteros. The sculptor Alfred Gilbert had already sculpted a statue of Anteros and, when commissioned for the Shaftesbury Memorial Fountain, chose to reproduce the same subject, who, as "The God of Selfless Love" was deemed to represent the philanthropic 7th Earl of Shaftesbury suitably. Gilbert described Anteros as portraying "reflective and mature love, as opposed to Eros or Cupid, the frivolous tyrant." Gilbert commented on his reason for the statue, saying:

The model for the sculpture was Gilbert's studio assistant, a 16-year-old Anglo-Italian, Angelo Colarossi (born 1875 in Shepherd's Bush).
Fernando Meacci was involved in the moulding of the fountain and it was probably cast by George Broad & Son.

The memorial was unveiled by The 1st Duke of Westminster on 29 June 1893. Following the unveiling there were numerous complaints. Some felt it was sited in a vulgar part of town (the theatre district), and others felt that it was too sensual as a memorial for a famously sober and respectable Earl. Some of the objections were tempered by renaming the statue as The Angel of Christian Charity, which was the nearest approximation that could be invented in Christian terms for the role Anteros played in the Greek pantheon. However, the name never became widely known and the statue was thence referred to as Eros, the god of sensual love; inappropriate some said in relation to the Earl's commemoration, but hailed by others as an ironic representation of the more carnal side of the neighbourhood, into which Soho had developed.

The whole memorial has been removed from the circus twice in its history. In 1922, construction began on the new tube station directly beneath the memorial. The memorial was therefore taken away and put in Embankment Gardens. It returned to Piccadilly Circus in 1931, but when the Second World War broke out in 1939, the statue only was removed for safety and kept in Egham. It did not return to Piccadilly Circus again until 1948.
The statue was again removed in the 1980s – this time for restoration – and resited upon its return in February 1985. During the restoration a set of plaster casts was unearthed in the basements of the Victoria and Albert Museum which revealed damage to the statue. The statue was also vandalised in 1990 and after radiography and restoration returned in 1994. In May 2012 the statue had a new bow string fitted after the original was broken by a tourist.

In the winter of 2013–14, the statue was covered with a PVC snow globe featuring internal fans blowing the "snowflakes". This also had the function of protecting the statue from vandalism and it was planned to return in subsequent years. However, strong winds caused the globe to become damaged and deflate and it was not subsequently repaired. In winter 2014–15, octagonal advertising hoardings forming a box for giant Christmas presents had a similar function.

See also
 1893 in art
 Art Gallery of South Australia, which has a replica
 Greek mythology in western art and literature
 Sefton Park, a park in Liverpool with a replica

References

External links

 The Shaftesbury Memorial Fountain at University of London & History of Parliament Trust

1893 establishments in the United Kingdom
1893 sculptures
Aluminium sculptures in the United Kingdom
Bronze sculptures in the United Kingdom
Drinking fountains in the United Kingdom
Grade I listed statues in the City of Westminster
Grade I listed monuments and memorials
Ancient Greece in art and culture
Monuments and memorials in London
Nude sculptures in the United Kingdom
Outdoor sculptures in London
Piccadilly Circus
Sculptures by Alfred Gilbert
Art Nouveau architecture in London
Art Nouveau sculptures and memorials